Nebraska Highway 39 is a highway in central Nebraska. It has a southern terminus west of Osceola at an intersection with Nebraska Highway 92. Its northern terminus is at an intersection with Nebraska Highway 14 southeast of Albion.

Route description
Nebraska Highway 39 begins in rural Polk County west of Osceola at Nebraska Highway 92.  It goes north through farmland, crosses the Platte River and meets U.S. Highway 30 at Silver Creek.  It runs northwesterly and crosses over the Loup River shortly before meeting Nebraska Highway 22.  NE 39 and NE 22 then overlap into Genoa.  They separate and NE 39 continues northwest into St. Edward.  It goes west out of St. Edward and at an intersection with Nebraska Highway 56, turns northwest again.  Shortly before Albion, the highway meets Nebraska Highway 14 and ends.

Major intersections

References

External links

Nebraska Roads: NE 21-40

039
Transportation in Polk County, Nebraska
Transportation in Merrick County, Nebraska
Transportation in Platte County, Nebraska
Transportation in Nance County, Nebraska
Transportation in Boone County, Nebraska